Joseph Howell (February 17, 1857 – July 18, 1918) was a U.S. Representative from Utah.

Life and career
Born in Brigham City, Utah Territory, Howell moved with his parents to Wellsville, Utah, in 1863.
He attended the common schools and the University of Utah at Salt Lake City.
He taught school, engaged in mercantile pursuits, and served as mayor of Wellsville from 1882 to 1884.
Howell served in the territorial house of representatives from 1886 to 1892.
After Utah gained statehood, Howell served as member of the State senate from 1896 to 1900. He was also regent of the University of Utah from 1896 to 1900.
Howell moved to Logan, Utah, in 1901.

Howell married Mary Maughan and their daughter Barabara Howell Richards served as a member of the Relief Society General Board.

Howell was elected as a Republican to House of Representatives for the Fifty-eighth and to the six succeeding Congresses (March 4, 1903 - March 3, 1917). Howell was involved in getting appropriations for the Mormon colonists who had fled Mexico in 1912.

Howell engaged in banking and the real estate business. The town of Howell, Utah, founded about 1910 on land owned by one of his business interests in Box Elder County, was named for him.

He died in Logan, Utah, July 18, 1918, and was interred in the Logan City Cemetery.

See also
 Parley Parker Christensen, Utah and California politician, opposed Howell.

Sources

External links

1857 births
1918 deaths
Latter Day Saints from Utah
Members of the Utah Territorial Legislature
People from Logan, Utah
People from Brigham City, Utah
People from Cache County, Utah
University of Utah alumni
Mayors of places in Utah
Utah state senators
Republican Party members of the United States House of Representatives from Utah
19th-century American politicians